The John N. and Elizabeth Taylor House (more commonly just Taylor House) is a historic home in Columbia, Missouri which has been restored and once operated as a bed and breakfast.  The house was constructed in 1909 and is a -story, Colonial Revival style frame dwelling.  It features a wide front porch and side porte cochere.   The home was featured on HGTV special called "If walls could talk."

It was placed on the National Register of Historic Places in 2001. In 2010 the house became a contributing property of the newly formed West Broadway Historic District.

References

External links
The taylor house inn

Houses on the National Register of Historic Places in Missouri
Colonial Revival architecture in Missouri
Houses completed in 1909
Houses in Columbia, Missouri
National Register of Historic Places in Boone County, Missouri